The 2010–11 Colorado Avalanche season was the 32nd season for the National Hockey League (NHL) franchise that was established on June 22, 1979, and 16th season since the franchise relocated to Colorado to start the 1995–96 NHL season.

The Avalanche posted a regular season record of 30 wins, 44 losses and 8 overtime/shootout losses for 68 points, failing to qualify for the Stanley Cup playoffs for the second time in three seasons.

Off-season
At the 2010 NHL Entry Draft, the Avalanche chose Joey Hishon, a centre, with the 17th overall pick.

Regular season
The Avalanche lost number one goaltender Craig Anderson on October 26 to a knee injury. Anderson, who was to be the backup that night in a game against the Vancouver Canucks, was participating in pre-game drills when he injured his knee. Peter Budaj stepped into the starting goaltender job and played well, but overall the Avalanche's goaltending has been an issue during the season. After joining the Avalanche during practice on January 22, Peter Forsberg decided to make a return to the NHL and signed a contract for the remainder of the 2010–11 season with the Avalanche on February 6. Forsberg played in two games with the Avalanche before announcing his retirement on February 14. Captain Adam Foote announced his retirement from the NHL on April 8, 2011, and played in his final game two days later on April 10 against the Edmonton Oilers.

The Avalanche struggled defensively during the regular season, finishing 30th overall in goals allowed, with 287 (excluding one shootout goal allowed). They also struggled on the penalty kill, allowing the most power-play goals in the league with 75 and had the lowest penalty-kill percentage in the league at 76.11%.

Playoffs
The Colorado Avalanche failed to qualify for the 2011 Stanley Cup playoffs.

Standings

Schedule and results

Pre-season 

|- align="center" bgcolor="#ccffcc"
| 1 || September 21 || Colorado Avalanche || 3 - 1 || St. Louis Blues || || Cann, Budaj || 1-0-0 ||
|- align="center" bgcolor="ffbbbb"
| 2 || September 22 || Los Angeles Kings || 4 - 2|| Colorado Avalanche || || Grahame, Anderson || 1-1-0 ||
|- align="center" bgcolor="ffbbbb"
| 3 || September 24 || Colorado Avalanche || 1 - 2 || Dallas Stars || || Budaj, Bacashihua || 1-2-0||
|- align="center" bgcolor="ffbbbb"
| 4 || September 26 || St. Louis Blues || 2 - 0 || Colorado Avalanche || || Anderson || 1-3-0 ||
|- align="center" bgcolor="ccffcc"
| 5 || September 28 || Dallas Stars || 1 - 2 || Colorado Avalanche || || Budaj || 2-3-0 ||
|- align="center" bgcolor="ffbbbb"
| 6 || September 30 || Colorado Avalanche ||1 - 2|| Dallas Stars || || Anderson || 2-4-0 ||
|- align="center" bgcolor="ffbbbb"
| 7 || October 2 (in Las Vegas, Nevada) || Colorado Avalanche ||2 - 3|| Los Angeles Kings || || Anderson || 2-5-0 ||
|-

Regular season

|- align="center" bgcolor="#CCFFCC"
| 1 || October 7 || Chicago Blackhawks || 3 - 4 || Colorado Avalanche || OT || Anderson || 18,007 || 1-0-0 || 2 || 
|- align="center" bgcolor="#FFBBBB"
| 2 || October 11 || Colorado Avalanche || 2 - 4 || Philadelphia Flyers || || Anderson || 19,652 || 1-1-0 || 2 || 
|- align="center" bgcolor="#CCFFCC"
| 3 || October 12 || Colorado Avalanche || 5 - 4 || Detroit Red Wings || SO || Budaj || 19,651 || 2-1-0 || 4 || 
|- align="center" bgcolor="#CCFFCC"
| 4 || October 15 || Colorado Avalanche || 3 - 2 || New Jersey Devils || || Anderson || 12,221 || 3-1-0 || 6 || 
|- align="center" bgcolor="#FFBBBB"
| 5 || October 16 || Colorado Avalanche || 2 - 5 || New York Islanders || || Anderson || 10,127 || 3-2-0 || 6 || 
|- align="center" bgcolor="#CCFFCC"
| 6 || October 18 || Colorado Avalanche || 3 - 1 || New York Rangers || || Anderson || 17,711 || 4-2-0 || 8 || 
|- align="center" bgcolor="#FFBBBB"
| 7 || October 21 || San Jose Sharks || 4 - 2 || Colorado Avalanche || || Anderson || 12,803 || 4-3-0 || 8 || 
|- align="center" bgcolor="#FFBBBB"
| 8 || October 23 || Los Angeles Kings || 6 - 4 || Colorado Avalanche || || Anderson || 15,478 || 4-4-0 || 8 || 
|- align="center" bgcolor="white"
| 9 || October 26 || Colorado Avalanche || 3 - 4 || Vancouver Canucks || OT || Budaj || 18,860 || 4-4-1 || 9 ||  
|- align="center" bgcolor="#CCFFCC"
| 10 || October 28 || Colorado Avalanche || 6 - 5 || Calgary Flames || || Budaj || 19,289 || 5-4-1 || 11 || 
|- align="center" bgcolor="#CCFFCC"
| 11 || October 30 || Columbus Blue Jackets || 1 - 5 || Colorado Avalanche || || Budaj || 13,017 || 6-4-1 || 13 ||  
|-

|- align="center" bgcolor="#FFBBBB"
| 12 || November 4 || Vancouver Canucks || 3 - 1 || Colorado Avalanche || || Budaj || 12,732 || 6-5-1 || 13 || 
|- align="center" bgcolor="#CCFFCC"
| 13 || November 6 || Dallas Stars || 0 - 5 || Colorado Avalanche || || Budaj || 16,172 || 7-5-1 || 15 || 
|- align="center" bgcolor="#FFBBBB"
| 14 || November 9 || Calgary Flames || 4 - 2 || Colorado Avalanche || || Budaj || 12,219 || 7-6-1 || 15 || 
|- align="center" bgcolor="#CCFFCC"
| 15 || November 12 || Colorado Avalanche || 5 - 1 || Columbus Blue Jackets || || Budaj || 13,594 || 8-6-1 || 17 || 
|- align="center" bgcolor="#FFBBBB"
| 16 || November 13 || Colorado Avalanche || 1 - 3 || Detroit Red Wings || || Budaj || 20,066 || 8-7-1 || 17 || 
|- align="center" bgcolor="#CCFFCC"
| 17 || November 15 || St. Louis Blues || 3 - 6 || Colorado Avalanche || || Budaj || 12,670 || 9-7-1 || 19 || 
|- align="center" bgcolor="#CCFFCC"
| 18 || November 17 || San Jose Sharks || 3 - 4 || Colorado Avalanche || OT || Budaj || 12,436 || 10-7-1 || 21 || 
|- align="center" bgcolor="#CCFFCC"
| 19 || November 19 || New York Rangers || 1 - 5 || Colorado Avalanche || || Anderson || 16,002 || 11-7-1 || 23 || 
|- align="center" bgcolor="#CCFFCC"
| 20 || November 20 || Colorado Avalanche || 4 - 3 || Dallas Stars || SO || Budaj || 17,441 || 12-7-1 || 25 || 
|- align="center" bgcolor="#FFBBBB"
| 21 || November 24 || Colorado Avalanche || 2 - 4 || Vancouver Canucks || || Budaj || 18,860 || 12-8-1 || 25 || 
|- align="center" bgcolor="#FFBBBB"
| 22 || November 25 || Colorado Avalanche || 2 - 3 || Edmonton Oilers || || Budaj || 16,839 || 12-9-1 || 25 || 
|- align="center" bgcolor="#CCFFCC"
| 23 || November 27 || Minnesota Wild || 4 - 7 || Colorado Avalanche || || Budaj || 18,007 || 13-9-1 || 27 || 
|- align="center" bgcolor="white"
| 24 || November 30 || Atlanta Thrashers || 3 - 2 || Colorado Avalanche || OT || Budaj || 12,131 || 13-9-2 || 28 || 
|-

|- align="center" bgcolor="white"
| 25 || December 3 || Colorado Avalanche || 1 - 2 || Carolina Hurricanes || OT || Anderson || 16,277 || 13-9-3 || 29 || 
|- align="center" bgcolor="#FFBBBB"
| 26 || December 4 || Colorado Avalanche || 5 - 6 || Tampa Bay Lightning || || Budaj || 18,212 || 13-10-3 || 29 || 
|- align="center" bgcolor="white"
| 27 || December 7 || Colorado Avalanche || 3 - 4 || Florida Panthers || OT || Anderson || 12,971 || 13-10-4 || 30 || 
|- align="center" bgcolor="#CCFFCC"
| 28 || December 10 || Colorado Avalanche || 4 - 2 || Atlanta Thrashers || || Anderson || 14,034 || 14-10-4 || 32 || 
|- align="center" bgcolor="#CCFFCC"
| 29 || December 11 || Colorado Avalanche || 3 - 2 || Washington Capitals || || Anderson || 18,398 || 15-10-4 || 34 || 
|- align="center" bgcolor="#CCFFCC"
| 30 || December 13 || Chicago Blackhawks || 5 - 7 || Colorado Avalanche || || Anderson || 15,924 || 16-10-4 || 36 || 
|- align="center" bgcolor="#CCFFCC"
| 31 || December 15 || Colorado Avalanche || 4 - 3 || Chicago Blackhawks || || Anderson || 21,121 || 17-10-4 || 38 || 
|- align="center" bgcolor="#CCFFCC"
| 32 || December 17 || Ottawa Senators || 5 - 6 || Colorado Avalanche || OT || Anderson || 15,113 || 18-10-4 || 40 || 
|- align="center" bgcolor="#CCFFCC"
| 33 || December 19 || Montreal Canadiens || 2 - 3 || Colorado Avalanche || || Anderson || 18,007 || 19-10-4 || 42 || 
|- align="center" bgcolor="#FFBBBB"
| 34 || December 21 || Los Angeles Kings || 5 - 0 || Colorado Avalanche || || Anderson || 15,891 || 19-11-4 || 42 || 
|- align="center" bgcolor="#FFBBBB"
| 35 || December 23 || Minnesota Wild || 3 - 1 || Colorado Avalanche || || Anderson || 16,323 || 19-12-4 || 42 || 
|- align="center" bgcolor="white"
| 36 || December 27 || Detroit Red Wings || 4 - 3 || Colorado Avalanche || OT || Budaj || 18,007 || 19-12-5 || 43 || 
|- align="center" bgcolor="#CCFFCC"
| 37 || December 30 || Colorado Avalanche || 4 - 3 || Edmonton Oilers || SO || Anderson || 16,839 || 20-12-5 || 45 || 
|- align="center" bgcolor="#FFBBBB"
| 38 || December 31 || Colorado Avalanche || 2 - 3 || Calgary Flames || || Anderson || 19,289 || 20-13-5 || 45 || 
|-

|- align="center" bgcolor="#FFBBBB"
| 39 || January 2 || Vancouver Canucks || 2 - 1 || Colorado Avalanche || || Anderson || 15,323 || 20-14-5 || 45 || 
|- align="center" bgcolor="#CCFFCC"
| 40 || January 4 || Buffalo Sabres || 3 - 4 || Colorado Avalanche || OT || Budaj || 12,548 || 21-14-5 || 47 || 
|- align="center" bgcolor="#FFBBBB"
| 41 || January 6 || Phoenix Coyotes || 2 - 0 || Colorado Avalanche || || Anderson || 12,308 || 21-15-5 || 47 || 
|- align="center" bgcolor="white"
| 42 || January 8 || New York Islanders || 4 - 3 || Colorado Avalanche || OT || Anderson || 15,171 || 21-15-6 || 48 || 
|- align="center" bgcolor="#CCFFCC"
| 43 || January 10 || Detroit Red Wings || 4 - 5 || Colorado Avalanche || || Budaj || 17,535 || 22-15-6 || 50 || 
|- align="center" bgcolor="#FFBBBB"
| 44 || January 12 || Colorado Avalanche || 0 - 4 || Chicago Blackhawks || || Budaj || 21,356 || 22-16-6 || 50 || 
|- align="center" bgcolor="#CCFFCC"
| 45 || January 14 || Colorado Avalanche || 4 - 1 || Minnesota Wild || || Anderson || 18,218 || 23-16-6 || 52 || 
|- align="center" bgcolor="#CCFFCC"
| 46 || January 18 || Vancouver Canucks || 3 - 4 || Colorado Avalanche || OT || Anderson || 12,791 || 24-16-6 || 54 || 
|- align="center" bgcolor="#FFBBBB"
| 47 || January 20 || Nashville Predators || 5 - 1 || Colorado Avalanche || || Anderson || 12,638 || 24-17-6 || 54 || 
|- align="center" bgcolor="#FFBBBB"
| 48 || January 22 || Boston Bruins || 6 - 2 || Colorado Avalanche || || Anderson || 18,007 || 24-18-6 || 54 || 
|- align="center" bgcolor="#CCFFCC"
| 49 || January 24 || St. Louis Blues || 3 - 4 || Colorado Avalanche || || Budaj || 12,338 || 25-18-6 || 56 || 
|- align="center" bgcolor="#FFBBBB"
| 50 || January 26 || Phoenix Coyotes || 5 - 2 || Colorado Avalanche || || Anderson || 13,740 || 25-19-6 || 56 || 
|-

|- align="center" bgcolor="#FFBBBB"
| 51 || February 3 || Minnesota Wild || 4 - 3 || Colorado Avalanche || || Anderson || 13,818 || 25-20-6 || 56 || 
|- align="center" bgcolor="#FFBBBB"
| 52 || February 5 || Anaheim Ducks || 3 - 0 || Colorado Avalanche || || Budaj || 16,785 || 25-21-6 || 56 || 
|- align="center" bgcolor="#FFBBBB"
| 53 || February 7 || Colorado Avalanche || 0 - 3 || Phoenix Coyotes || || Anderson || 9,508 || 25-22-6 || 56 || 
|- align="center" bgcolor="#FFBBBB"
| 54 || February 9 || Colorado Avalanche || 2 - 3 || Minnesota Wild || || Anderson || 18,194 || 25-23-6 || 56 || 
|- align="center" bgcolor="#FFBBBB"
| 55 || February 11 || Colorado Avalanche || 1 - 3 || Columbus Blue Jackets || || Budaj || 16,408 || 25-24-6 || 56 || 
|- align="center" bgcolor="#FFBBBB"
| 56 || February 12 || Colorado Avalanche || 3 - 5 || Nashville Predators || || Budaj || 17,113 || 25-25-6 || 56 || 
|- align="center" bgcolor="#FFBBBB"
| 57 || February 14 || Calgary Flames || 9 - 1 || Colorado Avalanche || || Budaj || 14,035 || 25-26-6 || 56 ||  
|- align="center" bgcolor="white"
| 58 || February 16 || Pittsburgh Penguins || 3 - 2 || Colorado Avalanche || OT || Budaj || 17,357 || 25-26-7 || 57 || 
|- align="center" bgcolor="#FFBBBB"
| 59 || February 19 || Colorado Avalanche || 0 - 4 || San Jose Sharks || || Budaj || 17,562 || 25-27-7 || 57 || 
|- align="center" bgcolor="#CCFFCC"
| 60 || February 22 || Colorado Avalanche || 4 - 3 || St. Louis Blues || || Budaj || 19,150 || 26-27-7 || 59 || 
|- align="center" bgcolor="#FFBBBB"
| 61 || February 23 || Edmonton Oilers || 5 - 1 || Colorado Avalanche || || Elliott || 14,801 || 26-28-7 || 59 || 
|- align="center" bgcolor="#FFBBBB"
| 62 || February 26 || Colorado Avalanche || 3 - 4 || Los Angeles Kings || || Elliott || 18,118 || 26-29-7 || 59 || 
|- align="center" bgcolor="#FFBBBB"
| 63 || February 27 || Colorado Avalanche || 2 - 3 || Anaheim Ducks || || Budaj || 14,510 || 26-30-7 || 59 || 
|-

|- align="center" bgcolor="white"
| 64 || March 1 || Colorado Avalanche || 1 - 2 || San Jose Sharks || SO || Elliott || 17,562 || 26-30-8 || 60 || 
|- align="center" bgcolor="#FFBBBB"
| 65 || March 5 || Edmonton Oilers || 5 - 1 || Colorado Avalanche || || Elliott || 15,869 || 26-31-8 || 60 || 
|- align="center" bgcolor="#FFBBBB"
| 66 || March 8 || Colorado Avalanche || 2 - 5 || Minnesota Wild || || Budaj || 18,441 || 26-32-8 || 60 || 
|- align="center" bgcolor="#FFBBBB"
| 67 || March 11 || Anaheim Ducks || 6 - 2 || Colorado Avalanche || || Elliot || 16,224 || 26-33-8 || 60 || 
|- align="center" bgcolor="#FFBBBB"
| 68 || March 12 || Colorado Avalanche || 2 - 4 || Nashville Predators || || Budaj || 17,113 || 26-34-8 || 60 || 
|- align="center" bgcolor="#FFBBBB"
| 69 || March 16 || Colorado Avalanche || 2 - 4 || Vancouver Canucks || || Elliott || 18,860 || 26-35-8 || 60 || 
|- align="center" bgcolor="#FFBBBB"
| 70 || March 17 || Colorado Avalanche || 2 - 5 || Calgary Flames || || Budaj || 19,289 || 26-36-8 || 60 || 
|- align="center" bgcolor="#CCFFCC"
| 71 || March 19 || Colorado Avalanche || 3 - 2 || Edmonton Oilers || SO || Elliott || 16,839 || 27-36-8 || 62 || 
|- align="center" bgcolor="#CCFFCC"
| 72 || March 22 || Columbus Blue Jackets || 5 - 4 || Colorado Avalanche || SO || Elliott || 12,301 || 28-36-8 || 64 || 
|- align="center" bgcolor="#FFBBBB"
| 73 || March 24 || Toronto Maple Leafs || 4 - 3 || Colorado Avalanche || || Budaj || 14,364 || 28-37-8 || 64 || 
|- align="center" bgcolor="#FFBBBB"
| 74 || March 26 || Colorado Avalanche || 1 - 4 || Los Angeles Kings || || Budaj || 18,118 || 28-38-8 || 64 || 
|- align="center" bgcolor="#FFBBBB"
| 75 || March 28 || Colorado Avalanche || 4 - 5 || Anaheim Ducks || || Elliott || 14,336 || 28-39-8 || 64 || 
|- align="center" bgcolor="#FFBBBB"
| 76 || March 31 || Nashville Predators || 3 - 2 || Colorado Avalanche || || Elliott || 13,239 || 28-40-8 || 64 || 
|-

|- align="center" bgcolor="#CCFFCC"
| 77 || April 1 || Colorado Avalanche || 4 - 3 || Phoenix Coyotes || SO || Budaj || 15,739 || 29-40-8 || 66 || 
|- align="center" bgcolor="#FFBBBB"
| 78 || April 3 || Calgary Flames || 2 - 1 || Colorado Avalanche || || Budaj || 13,896 || 29-41-8 || 66 || 
|- align="center" bgcolor="#FFBBBB"
| 79 || April 5 || Colorado Avalanche || 1 - 3 || St. Louis Blues || || Budaj || 19,150 || 29-42-8 || 66 || 
|- align="center" bgcolor="#FFBBBB"
| 80 || April 7 || Colorado Avalanche || 2 - 4 || Dallas Stars || || Elliott || 15,105 || 29-43-8 || 66 || 
|- align="center" bgcolor="#FFBBBB"
| 81 || April 8 || Dallas Stars || 3 - 2 || Colorado Avalanche || || Budaj || 14,037 || 29-44-8 || 66 || 
|- align="center" bgcolor="#CCFFCC"
| 82 || April 10 || Edmonton Oilers || 3 - 4 || Colorado Avalanche || OT || Budaj || 17,566 || 30-44-8 || 68 || 
|-

Player statistics

Skaters
Note: GP = Games played; G = Goals; A = Assists; Pts = Points; +/− = Plus/minus; PIM = Penalty minutes

Goaltenders
Note: GP = Games played; TOI = Time on ice (minutes); W = Wins; L = Losses; OT = Overtime losses; GA = Goals against; GAA= Goals against average; SA= Shots against; Sv% = Save percentage; SO= Shutouts; G= Goals; A= Assists; PIM= Penalties in minutes

†Denotes player spent time with another team before joining Avalanche. Stats reflect time with the Avalanche only.
‡Traded mid-season

Awards and records

Awards

Records

Milestones

Transactions 
The Avalanche have been involved in the following transactions during the 2010–11 season.

Trades

Notes

Free agents acquired

Free agents lost

Lost via retirement

Player signings

Draft picks
Colorado had 8 picks at the 2010 NHL Entry Draft in Los Angeles, California.

Farm teams

Lake Erie Monsters 
The Avalanche's American Hockey League affiliate is the Lake Erie Monsters, based in Cleveland, Ohio.

Tulsa Oilers 
The Avalanche's Central Hockey League affiliate is the Tulsa Oilers, based in Tulsa, Oklahoma.

See also
 2010–11 NHL season

References

External links 
 Colorado Avalanche Official site

Colorado Avalanche seasons
C
C
Colorado Avalanche
Colorado Avalanche